Bockarie is a common surname among the Mende people of Sierra Leone. Notable people with the surname include:

Sam Bockarie, former Sierra Leone rebel leader
Emmerson Amidu Bockarie, Sierra Leone musician

Surnames of African origin